Grybów  (Hrybiv; , Grynberk; , Gribuv), is a town in the Nowy Sącz County, in Lesser Poland Voivodeship of Poland, with 12,409 inhabitants (2005). It is located in the heartland of the Doły Jasielsko Sanockie (Doły Pits), and its average altitude is 370 metres above sea level, although there are some hills located within the confines of the city, Grybów has the steepest town square in medieval Europe.

History 

The history of Grybów dates back to the Early Middle Ages in Poland, when the settlement belonged to the Castelany in Biecz under King Casimir III the Great of the Piast dynasty. The town charter was issued by Kazimierz on May 15, 1340 for Hanko Bogacz, following destruction caused by the Mongol invasion. The new town centre was erected on a hill at the site of former Biała village. At that time, Grybow was called Grynberg (see Walddeutsche).

Due to convenient location and several royal privileges, Grybow prospered and became a center of trade and cloth manufacturing. In the period known as Polish Golden Age, Grybow had a renowned school of sculptors, in which the figure of Madonna of Kruzlowa was made. During the catastrophic Swedish invasion of Poland (1655 - 1660) Grybow was captured by Swedes, who looted the town, and then set it on fire, together with ancient parish church and nearby castle. Swedish raid was followed by a Transilvanian invasion of 1657, which brought further destruction. Furthermore, there were frequent fires and outbreaks of plague, and by the late 17th century, Grybow turned into a small, poor town. In the summer of 1768, the area of the town witnessed Polish - Russian fighting, during the Bar Confederation.

Age of Partitions
From the first partition of Poland in 1772 until 1918, the town was part of the Austrian monarchy (compromise of 1867), the chief city of the district with the same name, one of the 78 provinces of Austrian Galicia. During Austrian rule, there was widespread poverty and starvation among local peasants. In 1846, several manor houses were burned in the so-called Galician slaughter. In 1849, Grybow was visited by Emperor Franz Joseph I of Austria, and in the 1860s, the town was visited by painter Artur Grottger, who came here to see his fiancée, Anna Monne. In 1900, Stanislaw Wyspianski and Józef Mehoffer also visited the town.

By the late 19th century, Grybow slowly recovered, due to construction of rail line, and discovery of oil. In May 1915, the Battle of Gorlice took place nearby. In the Second Polish Republic, Grybow was the capital of a county, but only until 1932, when Grybow County was dissolved. In the 1930s, local villages were centers of peasant protests (see 1937 peasant strike in Poland), and the town was visited several times by Wincenty Witos.

On August 20, 1942 360 Jewish citizens of the town were rounded up by the Nazis and taken two kilometers away to be slaughtered in the woods of Biata Nawa. 
There stands a monument on their mass grave today, and the restored Jewish cemetery was unveiled in November 2019.

In late 1944, the Wehrmacht named Grybow a fortress, but due to rapid Soviet advance, the Germans retreated in January 1945. Nevertheless, almost 70% of the town was destroyed.

Notable individuals
Polish writer and traveler Kamil Giżycki (1893–1968) was born in Grybów.

See also
 Walddeutsche from Doły Jasielsko-Sanockie, Poland

References

 Jewish Community in Grybów at Virtual Shtetl

Cities and towns in Lesser Poland Voivodeship
Nowy Sącz County
Kraków Voivodeship (14th century – 1795)
Populated places in the Kingdom of Galicia and Lodomeria
Kraków Voivodeship (1919–1939)